Tropidion tymauna is a species of beetle in the family Cerambycidae. It was described by Martins and Galileo in 2007.

References

Tropidion
Beetles described in 2007